Ronaldo Flowers (born 9 March 2003) is an Antigua and Barbudan international footballer who plays for the Antigua and Barbuda national football team.

Career statistics

International

References

External links
 

2003 births
Living people
Antigua and Barbuda footballers
Antigua and Barbuda international footballers
Association football midfielders